Estrellas Orientales (English: Eastern Stars), also known as Estrellas de Oriente, is a baseball team in the Dominican Winter League. Based in San Pedro de Macorís, the team has historically struggled, winning championships only in 1936, 1954, 1968 and 2019.

History
The team was established on 15 December 1910 with the idea of competing against Tigres del Licey, that dominated the Dominican League during those years. Estrellas Orientales won their first title in 1936 defeating Santiago Baseball Club, Tigres del Licey and Leones del Escogido. The team won the championship for the second time in 1954 and again in 1968.

In 2019, after 51 years, Estrellas Orientales won their fourth title after defeating Toros del Este in the championship series.

Roster

Retired numbers

Trivia
The Estrellas Orientales franchise is considered the equivalent of the Chicago Cubs among Dominican Teams because of their championship drought which lasted from 1968 until 2019.

References

External links
Official site

San Pedro de Macorís
Baseball teams in the Dominican Republic
Baseball teams established in 1910
1910 establishments in the Dominican Republic